Ernst Schala (13 July 1916 – 1977) was an Austrian field hockey player. He competed at the 1948 Summer Olympics and the 1952 Summer Olympics.

References

External links
 

1916 births
1977 deaths
Austrian male field hockey players
Olympic field hockey players of Austria
Field hockey players at the 1948 Summer Olympics
Field hockey players at the 1952 Summer Olympics
Place of birth missing